Puerto López Canton is a canton of Ecuador, located in the Manabí Province.  Its capital is the town of Puerto López.  Its population at the 2001 census was 16,626.

Demographics
Ethnic groups as of the Ecuadorian census of 2010:
Mestizo  80.8%
Montubio  6.9%
Afro-Ecuadorian  5.9%
White  3.4%
Indigenous  2.6%
Other  0.5%

See also
 Salango

References

 
Cantons of Manabí Province